Mordellistena aertsi is a species of beetle in the genus Mordellistena of the family Mordellidae. It was discovered in 1963 and can be found in France and Germany.

References

aertsi
Beetles described in 1963
Beetles of Europe